Dell'Agnello is an Italian surname. Notable people with the surname include:

 Sandro Dell'Agnello (born 1961), Italian former professional basketball player, and current basketball coach 
 Simone Dell'Agnello (born 1992), Italian footballer

See also 
Agnello 

Italian-language surnames